Steve Watene (birth unknown) is a former professional rugby league footballer who played in the 1990s. He played at club level for Wakefield Trinity Wildcats (Heritage № 1153).

Playing career
Watene made his début for Wakefield Trinity Wildcats during 1999's Super League IV.

References

External links
Search for "Watene" at rugbyleagueproject.org

Living people
Year of birth missing (living people)
Place of birth missing (living people)
United States national rugby league team players
Wakefield Trinity players
Rugby league second-rows